SHC-transforming protein 3 is a protein that in humans is encoded by the SHC3 gene.

Interactions 

SHC3 has been shown to interact with RICS and TrkB.

References

Further reading